Gothenburg Opera Dance Company (GöteborgsOperans Danskompani), formerly Göteborg Ballet, is a modern dance company based in Gothenburg, Sweden. It shares a performance space with the city's opera.

The company has recently transitioned from classical repertoire to a new focus on contemporary work. Johannes Ohman was the artistic director during this transitional period and he worked to create and sustain new relationships with innovative choreographers. The Göteborg Ballet currently has works by notable choreographers including: William Forsythe, Jirí Kylián, Ohad Naharin, Nacho Duato, Jorma Elo, Johan Inger, Kenneth Kvarnström, Alexander Ekman, Mats Ek, and Örjan Andersson. However, the Company continues to present classical ballet works such as Giselle and The Sleeping Beauty.

Adolphe Binder is the new artistic director as of 1 August 2011. Her appointment marks the first time a woman has been the head of the company in thirty-five years. She aspires to continue the development of her predecessor and expresses the importance of contemporary dance saying, "Dance is a microcosm of events in society and the wider world. Contemporary art will show future generations what values we used to have, what conflicts we used to deal with, and what we dreamed of."

References

External links
Archival footage of the Goteborg Ballet performing Episode 17 in 2010 at Jacob's Pillow Dance Festival

Goteborg Ballet
Modern dance companies
Culture in Gothenburg
Dance companies in Sweden